The Ilhéu Chão is a small islet within the Desertas Islands, a small chain of islands which are in turn within the Madeira archipelago. Chão is located to the southeast of the Madeira island.

External links
Madeiraarchipelago.com: photos of the Desertas Islands—Ilhas Desertas

Islands of the Autonomous Region of Madeira
Uninhabited islands of Portugal